is the Japanese word for "you".

Anata may refer to:

 Anata, a Japanese language second-person pronoun, sometimes used by married couples to refer to their partners
 Anata (band), a technical death metal band from Varberg, Sweden that formed in 1993
 'Anata, a Palestinian town in the Jerusalem Governorate in the central West Bank
Anata, a festivity celebrated since the early 1990s in the city of Oruro, Bolivia linked to pre-Hispanic agricultural practices
 "Anata" (song), a song by Utada Hikaru
 "Anata", a song by L'Arc-en-Ciel from their 1998 album Heart

See also
 Anatta, the Buddhist doctrine of "non-self"